Saiyan is a village in Agra district of Uttar Pradesh in India.

References

Villages in Agra district